Miastko  (formerly ), is a town in the Middle Pomerania region of northwestern Poland. Administratively it has since 1999 been part of Bytów County in the Pomeranian Voivodeship; previously (1975–1998) it had been in Słupsk Voivodeship.

History
Between 1815 and 1945 the town belonged to the Prussian Province of Pomerania. On 2 March 1945, it was taken by the Red Army, after which it was placed under Polish administration.

In 2012 a monument dedicated to the Polish Nation was unveiled in the town park.

Population
1950:  1,500
1960:  5,500
1970:  8,100
1975:  9,800
1980: 10,000
2004: 12,000
2016: 10,738

Gallery

Notable residents
 Julius Heinrich Franz (1847–1913) a German astronomer
 Tadeusz Sapierzyński (born 1958) a Polish Army officer, former commander of the special forces unit JW GROM
 Krzysztof Gliszczyński (born 1962) a Polish painter
 Ewa Gawryluk (born 1967) a Polish actress
 Wojciech Kałdowski (born 1976) a retired Polish 800 metre runner

International relations

Miastko is twinned with:

References

Cities and towns in Pomeranian Voivodeship
Bytów County